Newark and Sherwood United F.C. is a football club that represents the town of Newark-on-Trent, Nottinghamshire but were based in Balderton.

History
The club was formed as Worthington Simpsons and played in the Nottinghamshire Alliance for many years. In 1995 they were relegated from the Alliance's top flight, but after renaming as IDP Newark in 1998 they won promotion back as Division One runners-up.

In 2001 they changed name again, to Newark Flowserve, and in 2004 they opted to join the Central Midlands League. After a  five-year stint in the CML, Flowserve joined the Nottinghamshire Senior League.

In 2018, the club won 31 of its 34 league matches to secure the league championship, and with it promotion to Step 6. In May 2018 their promotion to the East Midlands Counties League was ratified by the Football Association League Committee.

In May 2020 the club was again renamed, to Newark. At the end of the 2020–21 season they were transferred to the Premier Division North of the United Counties League.  In May 2022 the club again changed name, this time to Newark and Sherwood United F.C. and the club moved to share with Collingham F.C. at Station Road, Collingham.

Honours
Nottinghamshire Senior League
Champions 2017–18

References

External links
Official Website

Football clubs in Nottinghamshire
Football clubs in England
Central Midlands Football League
East Midlands Counties Football League
Nottinghamshire Senior League
Works association football teams in England
Midland Football League
United Counties League